The British-German Association (BGA) is a nonprofit, membership organisation based in London, UK. Its mission is to promote understanding and forge links between Britain and Germany.

Background

Founded in 1951, the BGA is currently chaired by Peter Barnes. The Duke of Kent serves as its Royal Patron. The BGA works closely with the Foreign and Commonwealth Office and with the German Embassy in London.

The BGA hosts an annual calendar of educational, corporate, cultural and social events for its members. The BGA seeks to support and co-ordinate the work of other national, regional or sectoral voluntary organisations involved with the UK and Germany. The BGA works closely with the Deutsch-Britische Gesellschaft, its equivalent organisation in Germany.

Members

Membership of the BGA is open to any UK resident who supports the BGA's charitable objectives. The BGA is supported by corporate members, mainly major companies with business interests in the UK and Germany.  Major corporate members include:
 Bayer
 Bosch
 BMW
 Nord LB
 BASF
 Commerzbank
 Nord LB

References

Organizations established in 1951
Non-profit organisations based in London